Ugginakeri is a village in Dharwad district of Karnataka, India.

Demographics 
As of the 2011 Census of India there were 461 households in Ugginakeri and a total population of 2,440 consisting of 1,263 males and 1,177 females. There were 333 children ages 0-6.

References

Villages in Dharwad district